Kim Byung-hoon (born 22 October 1982) is a South Korean field hockey player who competed in the 2008 Summer Olympics.

References

1982 births
Living people
South Korean male field hockey players
Olympic field hockey players of South Korea
Field hockey players at the 2008 Summer Olympics